Taj Mohammad Khairi (born 1942) is a former Afghanistan wrestler, who competed at the 1988 Summer Olympic Games in the light-heavyweight event.

References

External links
 

Wrestlers at the 1988 Summer Olympics
Afghan male sport wrestlers
Olympic wrestlers of Afghanistan
1942 births
Living people
Asian Games medalists in wrestling
Wrestlers at the 1982 Asian Games
Asian Games silver medalists for Afghanistan
Medalists at the 1982 Asian Games